The  was a limited express train service in Japan introduced by Japanese National Railways (JNR) in July 1968, and later operated by the East Japan Railway Company (JR East) between  in Tokyo and  on the Shinetsu Main Line in Nagano Prefecture.

Rolling stock
Services were originally formed using 157 series EMUs, and services later used 181 series, 183 series, 185 series, 189 series, and 489 series EMUs.

Formation
9-car 489 series formations operating in later years were typically formed as shown below, with car 1 at the Ueno end.

History
The services initially used 157 series EMUs, which had been removed from former Hibiki services in September 1964.

From 1969, 181 series EMUs, also used on Asama services were introduced on Soyokaze services.

When first introduced, Soyokaze services featured reserved accommodation only, but from 15 November 1982, non-reserved cars were also included.

From the start of the revised timetable on 14 March 1985, 9-car 489 series EMUs were introduced on Soyokaze services.

From 3 December 1994, Soyokaze was down-graded to become an occasional service run between Ueno and Nagano, and was phased out before the opening of the Nagano Shinkansen.

Special services

Salon Express Soyokaze

Seasonal Salon Express Soyokaze services operated between 28 April 1984 and 5 May 1988 using the Salon Express Tokyo Joyful Train locomotive-hauled trainset.

Revival Soyokaze

On 30 and 31 August 2003, JR East operated a special Soyokaze service between Ueno and  using 189 series EMUs.

On 15 July 2012, JR East ran a special Soyokaze service between Ueno and Yokokawa using a 185 series EMU in "Amagi"-style JNR era livery.

On 8 September 2012, JR East ran a Soyokaze service between Ueno and Yokokawa using a 185 series EMU in "Amagi"-style JNR era livery. The Shinano Railway also ran a special Soyokaze limited express service between Karuizawa and Ueda on the same day, as part of the 15th anniversary celebrations of the creation of the Shinano Railway.

See also
 List of named passenger trains of Japan

References

Named passenger trains of Japan
East Japan Railway Company
Railway services introduced in 1968
Rail transport in Nagano Prefecture

ja:あさま#信越本線長野以南優等列車沿革